Falsimohnia is a genus of sea snails, marine gastropod mollusks in the family Buccinidae, the true whelks.

Species
Species within the genus Falsimohnia include:
 Falsimohnia albozonata (Watson, 1886)
 Falsimohnia anderssoni (Strebel, 1908)
 Falsimohnia fulvicans (Strebel, 1908)
 Falsimohnia hoshiaii (Numanami, 1996)
 Falsimohnia innocens (E. A. Smith, 1907)
 Falsimohnia minor (Strebel, 1908)
 Falsimohnia okutanii (Numanami, 1996)

References

External links

 
Gastropod genera